NMS Sborul was a torpedo boat of the Royal Romanian Navy. She was commissioned in 1920, after initially serving as Tb 81 T in the Austro-Hungarian Navy during World War I. She and six more sister ships were awarded to Romania as reparations after the war ended.

Construction and specifications
A vessel of the T-group of the 250t-class, Sborul was built by STT at the Port of Trieste. Under the designation 81 T, she was laid down on 6 February 1914, launched on 6 August that year and commissioned on 1 December. The crew consisted of 39 officers and enlisted men. Under the provisions of the Treaty of Saint-Germain-en-Laye, she was given as reparations to Romania in 1920, along with six more boats of the same class. Notably, Sborul was the only Romanian torpedo boat of the Second World War to still have her torpedo tubes. Along with the destroyers Mărăști and Mărășești, she was the only warship of the Romanian Navy to use 450 mm torpedoes, as opposed to most of the other vessels which used 533 mm torpedoes. Her armament consisted of two 66 mm naval guns, two 20 mm anti-aircraft guns and two 450 mm torpedo tubes.

Career
Sborul was captured by Soviet forces in 1944 and commissioned by the Soviet Navy as Musson. She was returned to Romania on 22 September 1945 and continued to serve until 1958, when she was scrapped.

While fighting on the Axis side during World War II, she was involved in the minelaying operation of the Bulgarian coast in October 1941. Sborul also took part in the Battle of Jibrieni on 17 December 1941.

References 

1914 ships
Ships built in Austria-Hungary
World War I naval ships of Austria-Hungary
Torpedo boats of the Austro-Hungarian Navy
World War II torpedo boats of Romania
World War II naval ships of the Soviet Union
Captured ships
Torpedo boats of the Soviet Navy